Edon may refer to:

People
 Aissa Edon (born 1981), Malian activist
 Edon Amaral do Neto (born 1967), Brazilian footballer 
 Edon Hasani (born 1992), Albanian football player
 Edon Júnior Viegas Amaral (born 1994), Portuguese footballer
 Edon Zhegrova (born 1999), football player

Places
 Édon, France
 Edon, Ohio, United States
 Edon, Vladimir Oblast, Russia

Other
 EDON, or United Democratic Youth Organisation (Cyprus)
 Shakaar Edon, Star Trek character

See also
 Eden (disambiguation)